Aleksandar Stevanović may refer to:
 Aleksandar Stevanović (footballer)
 Aleksandar Stevanović (politician)